Michael Byrnes may refer to:

Michael J. Byrnes (born 1958), American Roman Catholic Archbishop of Agaña on Guam
Michael Byrnes (writer), American author of 2000s and 2010s archeological thrillers
Michael Byrnes (born 1990), American mixed martial arts fighter (Strikeforce: Miami#Reported payout)

See also
Byrnes (disambiguation)
Michael Burns (disambiguation)
Michael Byrne (disambiguation)